Pavlos, Crown Prince of Greece, Prince of Denmark,  (born 20 May 1967), is the second child and eldest son of Constantine II, the last King of Greece from 1964 to 1973, and Anne-Marie of Denmark. Following the death of his father on 10 January 2023, he became head of the former Greek royal family. He was heir apparent to the throne of Greece and was its crown prince from birth, remaining so during his father's reign until the monarchy's abolition. As a male-line descendant of Christian IX of Denmark he is also a Danish prince, although not in succession to its throne.

Early life
Pavlos was born on 20 May 1967 at the Tatoi Palace north of Athens, used at the time as the secondary residence of the Greek royal family. He was the second child and first son of King Constantine II and Queen Anne-Marie of Greece. Constantine II had ascended the throne on 6 March 1964, aged 23, following the death of his father King Paul. In traditional Greek naming practices, first sons are often named after their paternal grandfathers. His mother is the youngest sister of Queen Margrethe II of Denmark and his father is the brother of Queen Sofía of Spain. His maternal grandparents were King Frederick IX of Denmark and Princess Ingrid of Sweden.

He displaced his older sister, Alexia, born in 1965, as heir to the throne, Greece's order of succession adhering to male-preference primogeniture.

Crown Prince
Pavlos was born into a turbulent era in Greek politics. Pavlos was born barely a month after a coup d'état which ended democratic rule in Greece over the king's objections on 21 April 1967, ushering in a military junta, led by Georgios Papadopoulos. In December of that year, Constantine attempted a counter-coup that failed due to planning mistakes, leaks, and insufficient military support. Pursued by the junta, Constantine fled with his wife, children, mother and sister to Rome. They then went to Copenhagen and lived with Anne-Marie's mother, Queen Ingrid. From 1967 to 1973, Greece officially remained a monarchy, with a regency appointed while the king lived in exile.

Following the discovery and suppression of a "wide-ranging" anti-junta movement, just before its outbreak, among the ranks of the mostly royalist Navy, Papadopoulos, on 1 June 1973, declared Greece a Presidential Republic with himself as president and proclaimed a referendum for 1 June 1973 on the issue of the monarchy. The referendum was held without opposition and its result confirmed the regime change, with Constantine becoming "officially" deposed. On 17 November 1974, after the fall of the dictatorship, the 1974 Greek legislative election was held, resulting in a victory for Constantine Karamanlis and his New Democracy party. Less than a month later, on 8 December, the Greek plebiscite of 1974 confirmed the referendum of the previous year: the majority voted for a republic (69%) with a minority voting for the restoration of the monarchy (31%).

Constantine announced that he "respects" the "decision of the Greek people." He and Anne Marie had been living with their family in London for several years. Pavlos's youngest siblings were born in London, Theodora in 1983 and Philippos in 1986. Pavlos was educated at the Hellenic College of London, founded by his parents in 1980. He attended the Armand Hammer United World College of the American West, Montezuma, New Mexico, in the U.S., from 1984 to 1986. After training at the British Army's Royal Military Academy Sandhurst, he was commissioned a second lieutenant in the Royal Scots Dragoon Guards in 1987 on a three-year short-service commission. He was promoted to lieutenant in April 1989, and relinquished his commission in April 1990. In 1993, he completed a bachelor's degree at the Georgetown University School of Foreign Service.

On 11 May 1994, the Greek Government under prime-minister Andreas Papandreou renounced the Greek-citizenship status of Pavlos, alongside Constantine, and the rest of the former royal family through law 2215/1994. The law stated that Constantine's Greek-citizenship status, and accordingly his family's, could only be restored under specific conditions, including the selection of an explicit surname. The following year, while sharing a house in Washington, DC, he and his cousin, Felipe VI of Spain, then Prince of Asturias, attended Georgetown University, where both obtained a Master of Science in Foreign Service. As an adult, he lives in New York City and London, working as an investment consultant. He is co-founder of Ortelius Advisors, an activist hedge fund.

Head of the Royal House of Greece
Following the death of his father on 10 January 2023, Pavlos ascended to the position of Head of the Royal House of Greece. He delivered Constantine's eulogy during the funeral ceremony and carried his coffin with his brothers, sons and nephews at the burial. A rumour circulated that Pavlos intended to permanently relocate to Greece, but this was later denied by the spokesperson of the former Greek royal family, Ivi Macris, as "completely false". On 22 January, 40 days following his father's death, Pavlos spoke to French magazine Point de Vue regarding his new role. In the interview, Pavlos thanked the public for their respect towards the Greek royal family and said that those who crowded the funeral, whether they were "monarchists or not", "paid tribute to a historical personality, a part of Greek history." When asked about the role he sees himself upholding in Greek society, Pavlos explained that he would "not take on an official role", but will "uphold the family's exemplary." He added that his son, Constantine-Alexios, would not take on any official role either, but would "follow his grandfather's example and be a good man."

Pavlos's first public statement as Head of the Royal House of Greece following Constantine's death occurred upon the Tempi train collision in February 2023, which caused the death of almost 60 people. Pavlos issued a statement saying, "Today all of Greece is mourning. Our thoughts and prayers are with the families who lost loved ones to this unimaginable tragedy and with the injured who we sincerely hope to be released from the hospital soon." Pavlos also thanked the rescue and medical teams involved for their "superhuman efforts", before giving his "heartbroken" condolences to the families who lost their children in the accident and asking God to bless them all. Soon after, as Pavlos was leaving Athens that month, it was revealed that he and his family had been searching for a home in Greece, with Pavlos telling journalists that he had not "found a house yet".

Personal life

Pavlos married American heiress Marie-Chantal Miller, whom he had met at a party three years earlier in New Orleans, on 1 July 1995. The Greek Orthodox rite wedding at St Sophia's Cathedral, London drew a rare modern panoply of royalty, but the ceremony proved to be legally invalid and had eventually to be repeated civilly (not normally required in the UK) in Chelsea because of a law requiring that marriages in England be conducted in English.

After their marriage, the couple took up residence in Greenwich, Connecticut, the job that Pavlos obtained with the Charles R. Weber ship-broking company being headquartered there. Later, he went to work at a New York City firm as an investment portfolio manager, before relocation to London for their children's education in 2004.

The couple has five children: Maria-Olympia (b. 1996), Constantine-Alexios (b. 1998), Achileas-Andreas (b. 2000), Odysseas-Kimon (b. 2004), and Aristidis-Stavros (b. 2008). 

Pavlos is a bluewater yachtsman and crews on the multi-record-breaking monohull Mari-Cha IV, owned by businessman and father-in-law, Robert W. Miller.

Titles, styles, and honours
From birth, Pavlos was the heir apparent to the throne of Greece and as such he was referred to as the Crown Prince of Greece with the style of Royal Highness. Following the deposition of the Greek monarchy in 1973, these titles and styles are no longer legally recognised by the government of the Hellenic Republic. Through his male-line descent from Christian IX of Denmark, he is also a Danish prince with the style of Highness.

Honours

National

  Grand Cross of the Royal Order of the Redeemer (by birth)
  Grand Cross with Collar of the Order of Saints George and Constantine 
  Grand Cross of the Order of George I
  Grand Cross of Order of the Phoenix
 Recipient of the Commemorative Badge of the Centenary of the Royal House of Greece

Foreign
 Knight of the Order of the Elephant (R.E., 1997)
 Recipient of the Commemorative Badge of the 50th Birthday Medal of King Carl XVI Gustaf (1996)

Ancestry
Pavlos was a direct descendant of three reigning sovereign monarchs at birth. He was the eldest son of the King of Greece, grandson of the King of Denmark and great-grandson of the King of Sweden, all living and enthroned when he was born. His paternal aunt, Sofía, was Queen consort of Spain. His paternal first cousin, Felipe VI, is the current King of Spain. His maternal aunt, Margrethe II, is the reigning Queen of Denmark.

By male-line descent, he is a member of the Schleswig-Holstein-Sonderburg-Glücksburg branch of the House of Oldenburg.

Pavlos is a scion multiple times of Queen Victoria and King Christian IX, who were dubbed the "grandmother of Europe" and "father-in-law of Europe" respectively, due to royal intermarriage. As a result, he descends from Christian IX of Denmark through three of his children; in the male line through his second son George I of Greece, in the female line through his eldest son Frederick VIII of Denmark and through King Christian's youngest daughter Princess Thyra, Duchess of Cumberland. He also descends thrice from Victoria of the United Kingdom; once through her third son Prince Arthur, Duke of Connaught and Strathearn, and twice through her eldest daughter Victoria, Princess Royal.

Notes

References

Bibliography
 
 
 
 
 Καδδάς, Αναστάσιος Γ. "Η Ελληνική Βασιλική Οικογένεια", Εκδόσεις Φερενίκη (2010)
 Ανδρέας Μέγκος "Εραλδικά Σύμβολα και Διάσημα του Βασιλείου της Ελλάδος", Εκδόσεις Στέμμα (2015)
 Εκδόσεις Στέμμα, "Κανονισμός Εθιμοταξίας και Τελετών της Βασιλικής Αυλής" (2016)

1967 births
Living people
20th-century Greek people
21st-century Greek people
Children of Constantine II of Greece
Danish princes
Graduates of the Royal Military Academy Sandhurst
Greek emigrants to England
Greek exiles
Greek people of Danish descent
Greek people of English descent
Greek people of German descent
Greek princes
Heirs apparent who never acceded
House of Glücksburg (Greece)
Members of the Church of Greece
People educated at a United World College
Pretenders to the Greek throne
Royal Scots Dragoon Guards officers
Sons of kings
Walsh School of Foreign Service alumni

Grand Crosses of the Order of Saints George and Constantine
Grand Crosses of the Order of George I
Grand Crosses of the Order of the Phoenix (Greece)